Östansbo IS is a Swedish football club located in Ludvika.

Background
Östansbo IS plays in Division 4 Dalarna which is the sixth tier of Swedish football. They play their home matches at the Björkliden in Ludvika.

The club is affiliated to Dalarnas Fotbollförbund. Östansbo IS have competed in the Svenska Cupen on 5 occasions and have played 6 matches in the competition.

Season to season

Footnotes

External links
 Östansbo IS – Official website
 Östansbo IS on Facebook

Sport in Dalarna County
Football clubs in Dalarna County
Association football clubs established in 1931
1931 establishments in Sweden